Alfred Bertrand (6 December 1919 – 22 November 1986) was a Belgian footballer. He played in one match for the Belgium national football team in 1948.

References

External links
 

1919 births
1986 deaths
Belgian footballers
Belgium international footballers
Place of birth missing
Association football forwards
R. Olympic Charleroi Châtelet Farciennes players
Standard Liège players